Oxydoras niger, the ripsaw catfish or cuiu cuiu, is a species of thorny catfish native to the Amazon, Essequibo and São Francisco basins in Bolivia, Brazil, Colombia, Ecuador, Guyana, Peru and Venezuela. This species is a minor component of local commercial fisheries. It has lateral thorns that can damage any potential predator or handler. It feeds by shifting through sand and detecting eatable parts with the taste receptors in the roof and floor of its mouth.

Ecology 
Oxydoras niger occurs over mud in streams and lakes. It is known from temperatures ranging from 24–29.8 °C (75–85.6 °F), pH range of 5–9, and an alkalinity range of 42–142. It is known to form schools.   This species feeds on detritus, chironomid and ephemeropteran larvae, and crustaceans.

In the aquarium
Oxydoras niger is a popular aquarium fish species. In the hobby, it goes by many names, including black talking catfish, razorback catfish, mother of snails catfish, ripsaw catfish and black doradid. This species grows to a large size and are often bought by unsuspecting aquarists when small. They will rapidly outgrow smaller tanks, so the aquarium should be as large as possible. O. niger is especially light shy and should be provided with sheltered areas to hide. Although these fish are peaceful, very small tankmates are still at risk of being eaten. This species readily accepts prepared foods. O. niger has not been bred under aquarium conditions.

References

Doradidae
Fish of Bolivia
Freshwater fish of Brazil
Freshwater fish of Colombia
Freshwater fish of Ecuador
Freshwater fish of Peru
Fish of the Amazon basin
Fish described in 1821
Taxa named by Achille Valenciennes